Kevin Howard Haberfield, GC (born July 1957) is a British former Royal Marine who was awarded the George Cross (GC), the highest decoration for gallantry not in the face of the enemy, in 2015. The award was backdated to the date of the action in Afghanistan on 22 November 2005. The only details released were that the award was made "for Services in the Field".

Haberfield served in the Royal Marines from January 1980 to January 2012. He had also served with the Special Boat Service (SBS).

References

1957 births
20th-century Royal Marines personnel
21st-century Royal Marines personnel
British recipients of the George Cross
Living people
People from Weston-super-Mare
Royal Marines ranks
Royal Navy personnel of the War in Afghanistan (2001–2021)
Royal Navy recipients of the George Cross
Special Boat Service personnel